Leroy N. Brown (July 17, 1887 – ?) was an American football and basketball coach.  He was the head football coach at Michigan State Normal College—now known as Eastern Michigan University—in Ypsilanti, Michigan from 1912 to 1913, compiling a record of 6–5–2.  He was also the head basketball coach at Michigan State Normal from 1912 to 1914, tallying a mark of 13–6.

Brown lived in Ann Arbor, Michigan. In 1914, he married Alice Steppans.

Head coaching record

Football

Basketball

References

1887 births
Year of death missing
Basketball coaches from Michigan
Eastern Michigan Eagles football coaches
Eastern Michigan Eagles football players
Eastern Michigan Eagles men's basketball coaches
People from Clarkston, Michigan